William McGee may refer to:

 William J. McGee, American consumer advocate 
 William C. McGee (born 1936), American politician, Republican member of the North Carolina General Assembly
 William D. McGee (1923–1945), American soldier and Medal of Honor recipient
 William John McGee (1853–1912), American geologist and anthropologist
 William Sears McGee (1917–2006), Justice of the Supreme Court of Texas
 William McGhee (1930–2007), African-American actor (also known as Bill McGee)
 Bill McGee (1909–1987), baseball player
 Bill McGee (Manitoba politician)
 Billy McGee (footballer) (1878–1939), Australian rules footballer

See also
 Willie McGee (disambiguation)
 William Magee (disambiguation)